The European KF1 Championship is a kart racing competition organised by the CIK-FIA.

This class used to be called Formula A and has changed since January 2007 when CIK-FIA decided to replace the 100 cc water-cooled two-stroke engines with 125 cc Touch-and-Go (TaG) water-cooled two-stroke engines (KF type). 

KF1 is the top level of karting. It is open to the best drivers aged 15 and up.

European Champions KF1

See also
 Karting World Championship
 CIK-FIA Karting European Championship

References

External links
 CIK-FIA – International Karting Governing Body
 1990 – 2009 CIK Results

Kart racing series